Jacaranda is a genus of 49 species of flowering plants in the family Bignoniaceae, native to tropical and subtropical regions of the Americas. The generic name is also used as the common name.

The species Jacaranda mimosifolia has achieved a cosmopolitan distribution due to introductions, to the extent that it has entered popular culture. It can be found growing wild in Central America, the Caribbean, Spain, southern and northern Africa, China, and Australia.

Etymology
The name is of South American (more specifically Tupi-Guarani) origin, meaning fragrant. The word jacaranda was described in A supplement to Mr. Chambers's Cyclopædia, 1st ed., (1753) as "a name given by some authors to the tree the wood of which is the log-wood, used in dyeing and medicine" and as being of Tupi-Guarani origin, by way of Portuguese.

Description
The leaves are bipinnate in most species, pinnate or simple in a few species. The flowers are produced in conspicuous large panicles, each flower with a five-lobed blue to purple-blue corolla; a few species have white flowers. The fruit is an oblong to oval flattened capsule containing numerous slender seeds. The genus differs from other genera in the Bignoniaceae in having a staminode that is longer than the stamens, tricolpate pollen, and a chromosome number of 18.

Taxonomy
The genus is divided into two sections, sect. Monolobos and sect. Dilobos DC., based on the number of thecae on the anthers. Sect. Monolobos has 18 species and is found primarily in western South America, Central America, Mexico, and the Caribbean. Sect. Dilobos, which is believed to be the primitive form, has 31 species and is found primarily in southeastern Brazil including the Paraná River valley. The anatomy of the wood in the two sections also differs. Although usually treated in sect. Monolobos, J. copaia differs somewhat from all other members of the genus and may be intermediate between the two sections (Dos Santos & Miller 1997).

Species 
Sect. Monolobos

 Jacaranda acutifolia Bonpl.
 Jacaranda arborea Urb.
 Jacaranda brasiliana (Lam.) Pers.
 Jacaranda caerulea (L.) J.St.-Hil.
 Jacaranda caucana Pittier
 Jacaranda copaia (Aubl.) D.Don
 Jacaranda cowellii Britton & P.Wilson
 Jacaranda cuspidifolia Mart. ex DC.
 Jacaranda decurrens Cham.
 Jacaranda ekmanii Alain
 Jacaranda hesperia Dugand.
 Jacaranda mimosifolia D.Don
 Jacaranda obtusifolia Humboldt & Bonpl.
 Jacaranda orinocensis Sandw.
 Jacaranda poitaei Urb.
 Jacaranda praetermissa Sandw.
 Jacaranda selleana Urb.
 Jacaranda sparrei A.H.Gentry

Sect. Dilobos

 Jacaranda bracteata Bur. & K.Schum.
 Jacaranda bullata A.H.Gentry
 Jacaranda campinae A.Gentry & Morawetz
 Jacaranda carajasensis A.Gentry
 Jacaranda caroba (Vell.) DC.
 Jacaranda crassifolia Morawetz
 Jacaranda duckei Vattimo
 Jacaranda egleri Sandwith
 Jacaranda glabra (DC.) Bur. & K.Schum.
 Jacaranda grandifoliolata A.H.Gentry
 Jacaranda heterophylla M.M.Silva-Castro
 Jacaranda intricata A.Gentry & Morawetz
 Jacaranda irwinii A.Gentry
 Jacaranda jasminoides (Thunb.) Sandw.
 Jacaranda macrantha Cham.
 Jacaranda macrocarpa Bur. & K.Schum.
 Jacaranda micrantha Cham.
 Jacaranda montana Morawetz
 Jacaranda morii A.Gentry
 Jacaranda mutabilis Hassl.
 Jacaranda obovata Cham.
 Jacaranda oxyphylla Cham.
 Jacaranda paucifoliata Mart. ex DC.
 Jacaranda puberula Cham.
 Jacaranda racemosa Cham.
 Jacaranda rufa Manso
 Jacaranda rugosa A.H.Gentry
 Jacaranda simplicifolia K.Schum.
 Jacaranda subalpina Morawetz
 Jacaranda ulei Bur. & K.Schum.

Cultivation

Jacaranda can be propagated from grafting, cuttings, and seeds, though plants grown from seeds take a long time to bloom. Jacaranda grows in well-drained soil and tolerates drought and brief spells of frost and freeze.

This genus thrives in full sun and sandy soils, which explains their abundance in warmer climates. Younger plants are more fragile and may not survive in colder climates when temperatures drop below freezing.

Uses 
Several species are widely grown as ornamental plants throughout the subtropical regions of the world, valued for their intense flower displays. The most often seen is the blue jacaranda (Jacaranda mimosifolia; syn. J. acutifolia hort. non Bonpl.). Other members of the genus are also commercially important; for example the Copaia (Jacaranda copaia) is important for its timber because of its exceptionally long bole.

Gallery

References

External links

 Dos Santos, G., & Miller, R. B. (1997).  Wood anatomy of Jacaranda (Bignoniaceae): Systematic relationships in sections Monolobos and Dilobos as suggested by twig and stem rays. IAWA Journal 18: 369–383. Available online  (pdf file).
 Goodna Jacaranda Festival at Evan Marginson Park, Goodna
 Agroforestry Tree Database
 Jacaranda Festival, Grafton 

 
Bignoniaceae genera
Trees of Argentina
Trees of Brazil
Trees of Mexico
Flora of Brazil
Flora of Mexico
Medicinal plants
Trees of Australia